The CFX Academy cricket team was a first-class cricket team representing the Zimbabwe's cricket academy in the country's domestic cricket competitions. They competed in the Logan Cup from 1999 until 2002. The club played their home matches at the Country Club, Harare.

First-class record

Players
The following players represented the team:

 Glen Barrett
 Thomas Benade
 Gary Brent
 Conan Brewer
 Ryan Butterworth
 Nyasha Chari
 Innocent Chinyoka
 Neetan Chouhan
 Ian Coulson
 Charles Coventry
 Guy Croxford
 Keith Dabengwa
 Colin Delport
 Terry Duffin
 Dion Ebrahim
 Sean Ervine
 Neil Ferreira
 Travis Friend
 Glenn Goosen
 Gregg Haakonsen
 Andre Hoffman
 Douglas Hondo
 Ryan King
 Greg Lamb
 Justin Lewis
 Campbell Macmillan
 Clement Mahachi
 Blessing Mahwire
 Alester Maregwede
 Doug Marillier
 Stuart Matsikenyeri
 Allan Mwayenga
 Andre Neethling
 Jordane Nicolle
 Mluleki Nkala
 Ray Price
 Pete Rinke
 Barney Rogers
 Arnold Rushambwa
 Sherezad Shah
 Vusimuzi Sibanda
 Richard Sims
 Wisdom Siziba
 Leon Soma
 Andrew Stone
 Paul Strang
 Alec Taylor
 Matthew Townshend
 John Vaughan-Davies
 Mark Vermeulen
 Dirk Viljoen
 Kingsley Went
 Jason Young

References

Former senior cricket clubs in Zimbabwe
Former Zimbabwean first-class cricket teams
Cricket teams in Zimbabwe